Quick Response Engine was a planning and scheduling program developed for the OS/400 platform. The program was developed by the Acacia Technologies division of Computer Associates in 1996. In 2002 the group was sold to SSA Global Technologies.

References

AS/400
Automated planning and scheduling